Andrei Andreyevich Batyutin (born 28 May 1995) is a Russian football player who plays for FC Shinnik Yaroslavl.

Club career
He made his professional debut in the Russian Professional Football League for FC Krasnodar-2 on 12 August 2014 in a game against FC Afips Afipsky.

He made his debut in the Russian Premier League for FC Ufa on 14 August 2016 in a game against FC Tom Tomsk.

References

External links
 
 

1995 births
Sportspeople from Krasnodar
Living people
Russian footballers
Association football forwards
FC Krasnodar-2 players
FC Ufa players
FC Zenit-2 Saint Petersburg players
FC Dynamo Saint Petersburg players
FC Avangard Kursk players
FC SKA-Khabarovsk players
FC Shinnik Yaroslavl players
Russian Premier League players
Russian First League players
Russian Second League players